Daniel Klein may refer to:

Daniel B. Klein (born 1962), professor of economics at George Mason University
Daniel Klein (grammarian) (1609–1666), medieval scholar of Lithuanian language
Daniel Martin Klein (born 1939), American author 
Dan Klein (born 1976), American professor of computer science at the University of California, Berkeley